Scopula batesi is a moth of the family Geometridae. It was described by Prout in 1932. It is endemic to Cameroon.

References

Endemic fauna of Cameroon
Insects of Cameroon
Moths of Africa
Moths described in 1932
Taxa named by Louis Beethoven Prout
batesi